Sheldon is an area of east Birmingham, England. Historically part of Warwickshire, it is close to the border with the Metropolitan Borough of Solihull and Birmingham Airport.

Sheldon is also one of the 69 electoral wards in Birmingham, and one of the four wards that make up the council constituency of Yardley. Areas covered by the ward are Lyndon Green, Well's Green, Sheldon itself and part of Garrett's Green.

Sheldon was mentioned in the Domesday Book as Machitone, meaning "Macca's farm". A Mackadown Farm existed in the area until the First World War, however, it is only remembered through Mackadown Lane, a residential road.

The suburb is home to the 300 acre Sheldon Country Park, a popular local attraction.

Population and housing
According to the 2001 UK Census there were 20,129 people living in 9,140 households in Sheldon with a population density of 3,481 people per km2 compared with 3,649 people per km2 for Birmingham. Sheldon has a low percentage of ethnic minorities in its population with only 5.9% (1,195) being of an ethnic minority compared with 29.6% for Birmingham in general.
The population had increased to 21,817 at the 2011 Census.

Housing in the area primarily dates back to the 1930s.  The area benefits from Sheldon Country Park which is adjacent to Birmingham International Airport and is served by numerous shops and businesses situated along the busy A45, Coventry Road.  This road acts as one of the city's primary gateways from Coventry.

There are two secondary schools serving the area: Cockshut Hill School and King Edward VI Sheldon Heath Academy. There are five primary schools, one of which is Roman Catholic. Sheldon Library also serves the area.

Politics
As of 2022, the two councillors representing Sheldon Ward on Birmingham City Council are Paul Tilsley and Colin Green, both Liberal Democrats. The ward has adopted a Ward Support Officer.

Birmingham City Council Elections, 5 May 2022 - Sheldon Results
Isra Abdi - Labour Party - 835
Mark David Andrews - TUSC - 89
Susan Axfrord - Conservative Party - 564
Colin Green - Liberal Democrats - 1534
Kevin Harrison - Green Party - 218
Oliver Jenkins - Conservative Party - 513
Joseph Piekarz - Labour Party - 743
Paul Tilsley - Liberal Democrats - 1752
Candidates Elected - Paul Tilsley and Colin Green - Liberal Democrats

Birmingham City Council Elections, 4 May 2006 - Sheldon Results
Robert Arthur Devenport - British National Party - 1132
Derek Anthony Johnson - Conservative Party - 556
Michael Johnson - Labour Party - 792
Paul Morris - National Front - 74
Colin Richard Preece - Legalise Cannabis Alliance - 45
Michael Paul Sheridan - Green Party - 139
Michael Howard Ward - Liberal Democrat - 3233
Candidate Elected - Michael Howard Ward - Liberal Democrat

Notable residents
 Ian Smith, town planning expert, also lived in Cranes Park Road in the 1960s and '70s.
 Rev. Thomas Bray, founder of the Society for the Propagation of Christian Knowledge, was Rector of Sheldon.
 Howard Brown, branch manager for the Halifax bank, won a staff competition to appear in their advertisements, was born and brought up in Sheldon.
 Kevin Warwick, professor of cybernetics lived there in the 1970s. In the latter part of this time he studied at Aston University.
 Andre Marriner, a Premier League football referee.

References

External links 

 Birmingham City Council: Sheldon Ward

Areas of Birmingham, West Midlands
Wards of Birmingham, West Midlands